The 2012 Aberto de Tênis do Rio Grande do Sul was a professional tennis tournament played on clay courts. It was the first edition of the tournament which was part of the 2012 ATP Challenger Tour. It took place in Porto Alegre, Brazil between 22 and 28 October 2012.

Singles main draw entrants

Seeds

 1 Rankings are as of October 15, 2012.

Other entrants
The following players received wildcards into the singles main draw:
  Marcelo Demoliner
  Gabriel Friedrich
  Fabricio Neis
  José Pereira

The following players received entry from the qualifying draw:
  Arthur De Greef
  André Ghem
  Alejandro González
  Hans Podlipnik

Champions

Singles

 Simon Greul def.  Gastão Elias, 2–6, 7–6(7–5), 7–5

Doubles

 Marcelo Demoliner /  João Souza def.  Simon Greul /  Alessandro Motti, 6–3, 3–6, [10–7]

External links
Official Website

Aberto de Tenis do Rio Grande do Sul
Aberto de Tênis do Rio Grande do Sul
2012 in Brazilian tennis